The Embassy of Guinea in London is the diplomatic mission of Guinea in the United Kingdom.

It was formerly located in the Belsize Business Centre, a multi-use office building in Kilburn.

Gallery

External links
 Embassy of Guinea in London

References

Guinea
Diplomatic missions of Guinea
Guinea–United Kingdom relations
Buildings and structures in the London Borough of Camden
Kilburn, London